Barbara Pollet (born 17 May 1963) is an Austrian former professional tennis player.

Pollet, who comes from Salzburg, played in two Federation Cup ties for Austria in 1985, against Japan and the USSR.

While competing on the professional tour she reached a career high singles ranking of 192 in the world, which was attained in 1986.

ITF finals

Singles: 1 (0–1)

Doubles: 1 (1–0)

See also
List of Austria Fed Cup team representatives

References

External links
 
 
 

1963 births
Living people
Austrian female tennis players
Sportspeople from Salzburg
20th-century Austrian women
21st-century Austrian women